Tom Wright (born 18 September 1957) is a British architect best known as the designer of the Burj Al Arab in Dubai, United Arab Emirates.

Biography
Born in Shirley, Croydon, Surrey in 1957, Wright studied at the Royal Russell School and then later at the Kingston University School of Architecture. Wright qualified as an architect the same year he was accepted as a member of the Royal Institute of British Architects in 1983 and went on from there to become a director of the architectural practice Lister Drew Haines Barrow, which was taken over in 1991 by Atkins. Wright became head of Atkins' architecture arm.

Wright became design director for the Jumeirah Beach Resort, Dubai, and designed the Burj Al Arab (Tower of the Arabs) at the same time. It was conceived in October 1994 and finished in 1999. The brief was to create an icon for Dubai: a building that would become synonymous with the place, as the Sydney Opera House is with Sydney and the Eiffel Tower is with Paris. The hotel is built in the shape of a dhow's (a traditional Arabic ship) sail to reflect Dubai′s seafaring heritage combined with a modern aspect moving forwards into the future. It costs 2,700 dollars on average per night to stay in a room at the hotel.

In 2013 Tom Wright, Geku George and Hakim Khennouchi left Atkins to create a new practice called WKK Architects incorporating in July 2013. WKK is also headquartered in Epsom Surrey, England.
 
One of his most recent projects is the co-design of Celebrity Cruises' new ship, Celebrity Edge, which brings a number of innovations to the cruise ship industry.

References

External links
Tom Wright website
WKK website

1957 births
Living people
Architects from Surrey
People educated at Royal Russell School
Alumni of Kingston University